Schnader Harrison Segal & Lewis LLP is a U.S. law firm based in Philadelphia, Pennsylvania, founded in Philadelphia in 1935 by former Pennsylvania Attorney General William A. Schnader, Bernard G. Segal, a former Deputy Attorney General serving under Schnader, and Francis A. Lewis.  The firm was initially named Schnader & Lewis.  Eventually, Segal was added as a name partner. The fourth name partner, Earl G. Harrison, joined the firm in 1948. Today, the firm has more than 180 attorneys in seven offices nationwide.

History
In 1935, after losing his bid for Governor of Pennsylvania, William A. Schnader decided to start his own law firm.  He was joined by  Bernard G. Segal, who had served as a Deputy Attorney General under Schnader, and Francis A. Lewis, who had been Schnader's campaign treasurer.  Earl G. Harrison, the former Dean of the University of Pennsylvania Law School and former Commissioner of the Immigration and Naturalization Service, joined the firm in 1948, becoming the fourth name partner.

The Schnader firm expanded over the years, opening offices in Washington, D.C.; Wilmington, Delaware; New York, New York; Cherry Hill, New Jersey; and, Pittsburgh, Pennsylvania. The firm operated a branch office in Atlanta, Georgia, from 1992-2008 and opened its first West Coast office in San Francisco, California, in 1999. In 2013, the firm entered into a non-exclusive association with the Jakarta-based law firm Yang & Co to provide representation to Indonesian companies and individuals requiring legal counsel in the U.S., and to U.S. companies and individuals requiring legal counsel in Indonesia. In 2014, Schnader announced the opening of an office in Melville, New York.
 The firm also greatly expanded its corporate capabilities by combining with the firm Mesirov Gelman Jaffe Cramer & Jamieson LLP in Philadelphia.

Today, Schnader has seven offices that serve local, national, and international clients ranging from large corporations to start-ups and entrepreneurs to individual clients in more than 40 areas of the law. In addition to the firm’s traditional strengths in complex litigation, commercial transactions, and wealth management, the firm has significant experience and depth in intellectual property, international commerce, labor and employment, financial services, construction law, real estate development, corporate governance, appellate services, technology-based companies, media and communications, government relations and regulatory affairs, energy and environmental issues, nonprofit, education, aviation issues, business reorganization, and securities and shareholder litigation

Notable lawyers and alumni
 Arlin Adams, former judge on the United States Court of Appeals for the Third Circuit (1969 to 1987)
 William H. Brown, III, former Chairman of the U.S. Equal Employment Opportunity Commission
 James J. Eisenhower, 2000 and 2004 Democratic candidate for Attorney General of Pennsylvania
 Ken Gormley, Dean and Professor of Constitutional Law, Duquesne University School of Law, Counsel to the firm 
 Philip Hamburger, professor of law at Columbia University Law School
Earl G. Harrison, Dean of the University of Pennsylvania Law School; Commissioner of the United States Immigration and Naturalization Service, 1942–44
 Timothy K. Lewis, former judge on the United States Court of Appeals for the Third Circuit (1992 to 1999)
 Lewis "Scooter" Libby, former Chief of Staff to Vice President Dick Cheney, practiced with Schnader after graduating from Columbia Law School.
 Neil Thomas Proto, former appellate lawyer, U.S. Department of Justice and General Counsel to President Carter’s Nuclear Safety Oversight Committee, and currently adjunct professor Georgetown University
 Jerome J. Shestack, president of the American Bar Association from 1997 to 1998, and formerly United States Ambassador to the United Nations Human Rights Council from 1979 to 1980.
 Harris Wofford, Democratic U.S. Senator from Pennsylvania from 1991 to 1995 and the fifth president of Bryn Mawr College 1970-1978.

Offices
 Cherry Hill, NJ
 Jakarta, Indonesia*
 New York, NY
 Philadelphia, PA
 Pittsburgh, PA
 San Francisco, CA
 Washington, DC
 Wilmington, DE

References

External links
 Homepage
 Profile from LexisNexis Martindale-Hubbell

Law firms established in 1935
Law firms based in Philadelphia
1935 establishments in Pennsylvania